Maxime D'Arpino (born 17 June 1996) is a French professional footballer who plays as a midfielder for Oostende in the Belgian First Division A.

Professional career
D'Arpino joined Olympique Lyonnais in 2006 at the age of 10, and signed his first professional contract with them in 2015. In June 2017, he joined Ligue 2 side US Orléans on loan for the 2017–18 season. He made his professional debut with Orléans in a 3–1 Ligue 2 win over AS Nancy on 28 July 2017.

On 30 June 2020, D'Arpino signed a 4-year contract with K.V. Oostende.

Career statistics

References

External links
 Ligue 1 Profile
 
 
 OLWeb Profile

1996 births
Living people
People from Villeurbanne
Association football midfielders
French footballers
France youth international footballers
Olympique Lyonnais players
US Orléans players
K.V. Oostende players
Ligue 2 players
Championnat National 2 players
Belgian Pro League players
French expatriate footballers
Expatriate footballers in Belgium
Sportspeople from Lyon Metropolis
Footballers from Auvergne-Rhône-Alpes